Tiffany Hines is an American actress, known for her roles as Birdie Scott in Beyond the Break, Michelle Welton in Bones, Jaden in Nikita, Didi Miller in Devious Maids, Tamar Braxton in Toni Braxton: Unbreak My Heart, Aisha in 24: Legacy, Eve Vincent in Hit the Floor, and Lara Nuzo in Magnum P.I..

Life and career
She starred as Birdie Scott in The N drama series Beyond the Break from 2006 to 2009. Hines guest-starred in television series such as Grey's Anatomy, Heroes, Criminal Minds, Miss Guided, Lincoln Heights, CSI: Crime Scene Investigation, Secret Girlfriend, 10 Things I Hate About You, and Lie to Me. She also starred in the NBC miniseries Meteor in 2009. Her film credits include The Winged Man, Shark Swarm, Dandelion Dharma, Perfect Combination, and The Dark Party.

She played the recurring character Michelle Welton, the adopted teenage daughter of Dr. Camille Saroyan, in the Fox series Bones.

Hines starred as Jaden in The CW's drama series Nikita from 2010 to 2011. She appeared in the fourth season of The CW's teen drama series 90210 as a detective named Kat, who helps Navid to arrest his uncle Amal. In 2012, she was cast in the ABC soapy pilot Americana, and in 2014 began a recurring role as Didi Miller in the Lifetime comedy-drama Devious Maids. In 2015, she performed guest-starring roles in Fox's Backstrom and CBS's Stalker; recurred as Marta Rodriguez in Stitchers, and starred in Damien in spring 2016. She recurred as Aisha in 24: Legacy opposite Corey Hawkins, Bashy, and Anna Diop. She starred as Eve Vincent in the last season of BET's Hit the Floor and recurred as Lara Nuzo in the Magnum P.I. reboot on CBS opposite Jay Hernandez, Perdita Weeks, Sung Kang, and Zachary Knighton. In Summer 2019, she played the starring role of Elizabeth Bennet in  the Lifetime network's Pride and Prejudice: Atlanta, based on the Jane Austen novel, with an African-American cast.

Filmography

Films

Television

References

External links

 

21st-century American actresses
African-American actresses
American film actresses
American television actresses
Living people
1985 births
Seven Hills School (Cincinnati, Ohio) alumni
21st-century African-American women
21st-century African-American people
20th-century African-American people
20th-century African-American women